Med dej vill jag leva is a 1992 Thorleifs studio album.

Track listing
"Med dej vill jag leva"
"Inga mörka moln"
"Jag dansar med en ängel"
"Andante, Andante"
"Ingen får mig att längta som du"
"Gabrielle"
"The Night Has a Thousand Eyes"
"Det är aldrig för sent"
"Bara en dröm"
"Galen i dej"
"Lätta bubblor" ("I'm Forever Blowing Bubbles")
"Jag vill ge dig en sång"
"Då vänder jag hemåt"
"Jag är kär" ("I'm in Love for the Very First Time")
"Då klappar hjärtan"

References 

1992 albums
Thorleifs albums
Swedish-language albums